Scutellaria elliptica, commonly called hairy skullcap, is a species of flowering plant in the mint family (Lamiaceae).  It is a perennial forb found in the southeastern and mid-eastern states of the United States. It has blue flowers.

Distribution
Sctellaria elliptica is found in several of the United States ranging from Texas on the west to New York on the east and Michigan on the north to Florida on the south. Its global conservation status is secure according to Natureserve.

References

elliptica
Endemic flora of the United States